Garbage barge may refer to:

A barge carrying garbage onboard
Mobro 4000
Khian Sea waste disposal incident